Zidky is an urban-type settlement in Chuhuiv Raion of Kharkiv Oblast in Ukraine. It is located on the right bank of the Donets. Zidky belongs to Zmiiv urban hromada, one of the hromadas of Ukraine. Population: 

Until 18 July 2020, Zidky belonged to Zmiiv Raion. The raion was abolished in July 2020 as part of the administrative reform of Ukraine, which reduced the number of raions of Kharkiv Oblast to seven. The area of Zmiiv Raion was merged into Chuhuiv Raion.

Economy

Transportation
Zidky railway station is on the railway connecting Kharkiv and Lyman via Izium. There is some passenger traffic.

Zidky is connected by roads with Kharkiv and with Izium.

References

Urban-type settlements in Chuhuiv Raion